The French National Cyclo-cross Championships is a cycling race that is held to decide the best French cyclist in the cyclo-cross discipline. The first edition took place in 1902.

Men

Elite

U23

Junior

Novice

Amateur

Women

Elite

U23

Junior

References

National cyclo-cross championships
Cycle races in France
Recurring sporting events established in 1902
1902 establishments in France
National championships in France